Rishabh Tiwari (born 1 September 1993) is an Indian cricketer. He made his first-class debut for Chhattisgarh in the 2016–17 Ranji Trophy on 6 October 2016. He made his Twenty20 debut for Chhattisgarh in the 2017–18 Zonal T20 League on 10 January 2018. He made his List A debut for Chhattisgarh in the 2018–19 Vijay Hazare Trophy on 30 September 2018.

References

External links
 

1993 births
Living people
Indian cricketers
Chhattisgarh cricketers
People from Jabalpur